The fulvus roundleaf bat or fulvus leaf-nosed bat (Hipposideros fulvus) is a species of bat in the family Hipposideridae. It is found in Afghanistan, Bangladesh, China, India, Myanmar, Pakistan, and Sri Lanka.

Taxonomy
The fulvus roundleaf bat was described as a new species in 1838 by British zoologist John Edward Gray.
The holotype had been collected by Walter Elliot in the Madras, India (now Chennai).
Gray stated that its fur was "reddish fulvous", giving it the species name "fulvus".

Description
It has large ears that are rounded at the tips. Its fur color is variable; individuals have been documented with pale yellow, golden orange, and pale gray fur.

Range and habitat
It is native to Central and South Asia, and has been documented in the following countries: Afghanistan, Bangladesh, China, India, Pakistan, and Sri Lanka.

Conservation
As of 2019, it is evaluated as a least-concern species by the IUCN. It meets the criteria for this classification because it has a wide—if patchy—geographic range, and it is not likely to be experiencing rapid population decline. It has a low population density, however, and is threatened by disturbance of its roosts.

References

Hipposideros
Bats of South Asia
Bats of Southeast Asia
Bats of India
Mammals of Afghanistan
Mammals of Pakistan
Mammals of Sri Lanka
Mammals described in 1838
Taxonomy articles created by Polbot
Taxa named by John Edward Gray